Statistics of the  Cambodian League for the 1996 season.

Overview
Body Guards Club won the championship.

References
RSSSF

C-League seasons
Cambodia
Cambodia
football